Good Friends and Faithful Neighbours may refer to:

 Good Friends and Faithful Neighbours (1938 film), Swedish film
 Good Friends and Faithful Neighbours (1960 film), Swedish film